Isidore Frégeau (December 9, 1833 – September 2, 1906) was a physician and political figure in Quebec. He represented Shefford in the Legislative Assembly of Quebec from 1881 to 1886 as a Conservative.

He was born in Saint-Pie, the son of Jean-Baptiste Frégeau and Angélique Lemonde. He qualified to practise medicine in 1861 and practised in North Stukely, Lawrenceville, Waterloo and Sherbrooke. He was married twice: to Marie-Onésime-Caroline Tétro-Ducharme in 1862 and to Hermine Simoneau in 1887. Frégeau was mayor of North Stukely for 10 years. He died in Sherbrooke at the age of 72.

References
 

1833 births
1906 deaths
Conservative Party of Quebec MNAs
Mayors of places in Quebec